The United States has since 1979 applied various economic, trade, scientific and military sanctions against Iran. United States economic sanctions are administered by the  Office of Foreign Assets Control (OFAC), an agency of the United States Department of the Treasury. Currently, United States sanctions against Iran include an embargo on dealings with the country by the United States, and a ban on selling aircraft and repair parts to Iranian aviation companies.

The United States has imposed sanctions against Iran in response to the Iranian nuclear program and Iranian support for Hezbollah, Hamas, and Palestine Islamic Jihad, that are considered terrorist organizations by the United States. Iranian support for the Shia militias in Iraq and the Houthis in the Yemen civil war are also in contention.

On 17 May 2018, the European Commission announced its intention to implement the blocking statute of 1996 to declare United States sanctions against Iran null and void in Europe and ban European citizens and companies from complying with them. The EC also instructed the European Investment Bank to facilitate European companies' investment in Iran.

Legal basis
United States sanctions can be imposed under the National Emergencies Act (NEA) of 1976, the International Emergency Economic Powers Act (IEEPA) of 1977 and the Iran and Libya Sanctions Act  of 1996 (ILSA, later renamed to Iran Sanctions Act (ISA)). Declarations under NEA and IEEPA must be renewed annually to remain in effect. Another sanctions law is the Countering America's Adversaries Through Sanctions Act of 2017.

Carter presidency 
United States President Carter imposed sanctions against Iran in November 1979 after radical students seized the United States Embassy in Tehran and took hostages, after the United States permitted the exiled Shah of Iran to enter the United States for medical treatment.  froze about US$8.1 billion in Iranian assets, including bank deposits, gold and other properties. It also imposed a trade embargo. The sanctions were lifted in January 1981 as part of the Algiers Accords, which was a negotiated settlement of the hostages’ release.

Reagan presidency
United States President Ronald Reagan imposed an arms embargo in 1983 on Iran, including United States military spare parts to the military during the Iran–Iraq War (1981–1988).

An embargo on Iranian goods and services was imposed in 1987 in response to Iran's actions from 1981 to 1987 against the United States and other vessels in the Persian Gulf and because of Iran's support for terrorism.

Clinton presidency 
United States President Bill Clinton imposed some of the toughest sanctions against Iran in March 1995, during the presidency of Akbar Hashemi Rafsanjani, in response to the Iranian nuclear program and Iranian support for Hezbollah, Hamas, and Palestine Islamic Jihad, that are considered terrorist organizations by the United States under , to prohibit the United States from trading in Iran's oil industry. In May 1995 Clinton also issued  to prohibit the United States from trading with Iran. Trade with the United States, which had been growing since the end of the Iran–Iraq War, ended abruptly.

Iran and Libya Sanctions Act
 

The Iran and Libya Sanctions Act (ILSA) was signed into law on 5 August 1996 by President Clinton. ISA (the renamed ILSA in 2006) targets both American and non-American businesses that make investments over $20 million in Iran for the development of petroleum resources in Iran. They face having imposed against them two out of seven possible penalties by the United States:
 denial of Export-Import Bank assistance,
 denial of export licenses for exports to the violating company,
 prohibition on loans or credits from United States financial institutions of over $10 million in any 12-month period,
 prohibition on designation as a primary dealer for United States government debt instruments,
 prohibition on serving as an agent of the United States or as a repository for U.S. government funds,
 denial of United States government procurement opportunities (consistent with WTO obligations), and
 a ban on all or some imports of the violating company.

ISA was extended several times under the presidency of George W. Bush, and on December 1, 2016, it was extended under President Barack Obama, before vacating office, for a further ten years.

Early Khatami government
After the election of Iranian reformist President Mohammad Khatami in 1997, President Clinton eased sanctions on Iran. In 2000 the sanctions for items such as pharmaceuticals, medical equipment, caviar and Persian rugs were reduced.

Bush presidency
In February 2004, during the final year of Khatami's presidency, the United States Department of the Treasury in the presidency of George W. Bush ruled against editing or publishing scientific manuscripts from Iran, and stated that the American scientists collaborating with Iranians could be prosecuted. As a consequence, the Institute of Electrical and Electronics Engineers (IEEE) temporarily stopped editing manuscripts from Iranian researchers and took steps to clarify the OFAC guidelines concerning its publishing and editing activities. In April 2004 IEEE received a response from OFAC which fully resolved that no licenses were needed for publishing works from Iran and that the entire IEEE publication process including peer review and editing was exempt from restrictions. On the other hand, the American Institute of Physics (AIP), the American Physical Society and the American Association for the Advancement of Science, which publishes Science, refused to comply, saying that the prohibition on publishing goes against freedom of speech.

After being elected president in 2005, President Ahmadinejad lifted the suspension of uranium enrichment that had been agreed with the EU3, and the International Atomic Energy Agency reported Iran's non-compliance with its safeguards agreement to the UN Security Council. The United States government then began pushing for UN sanctions against Iran over its nuclear program.

In June 2005, President George W. Bush issued  freezing the assets of individuals connected with Iran's nuclear program. In June 2007, the U.S. state of Florida enacted a boycott on companies trading with Iran and Sudan, while New Jersey's state legislature was considering similar action.

The United Nations Security Council (UNSC) adopted Resolution 1737 in December 2006, Resolution 1747 in March 2007, Resolution 1803 in March 2008, and Resolution 1929 in June 2010.

Banking sanctions
Iranian financial institutions are barred from directly accessing the U.S. financial system, but they are permitted to do so indirectly through banks in other countries. In September 2006, the United States government imposed sanctions on Bank Saderat Iran, barring it from dealing with U.S. financial institutions, even indirectly. The move was announced by Stuart Levey, the undersecretary for treasury, who accused the major state-owned bank in Iran of transferring funds for certain groups, including Hezbollah. Levey said that since 2001 a Hezbollah-controlled organization had received $50 million directly from Iran through Bank Saderat. He said the United States government will also persuade European banks and financial institutions not to deal with Iran. As of November 2007, the following Iranian banks were prohibited from transferring money to or from United States banks:
 Bank Sepah
 Bank Saderat Iran
 Bank Melli Iran
 Bank Kargoshaee (aka Kargosa’i Bank)
 Arian Bank (aka Aryan Bank)

In other words, these banks were placed on the Office of Foreign Assets Control (OFAC) Specially Designated Nationals List (SDN List). The SDN List is a directory of entities and individuals who have been prohibited from accessing the U.S. financial system. Although difficult there are ways to carry out an OFAC SDN List removal.

As of early 2008, the targeted banks, such as Bank Mellat, had been able to replace banking relationships with a few large sanction-compliant banks with relationships with a larger number of smaller non-compliant banks. In 2008, the United States Department of the Treasury ordered Citigroup Inc. to freeze over $2 billion held for Iran in Citigroup accounts.

For individuals and small businesses, these banking restrictions have created a large opportunity for the hawala market, which allows Iranians to transfer money to and from foreign countries using an underground unregulated exchange system. In June 2010, in the case United States v. Banki, the use of the hawala method of currency transfer led to a criminal conviction against a U.S. citizen of Iranian origin. Banki was sentenced to two and a half years in federal prison; however, on the sentencing guidelines, this type of offense could result in imprisonment of up to 20 years.

Obama presidency
On June 24, 2010, the United States Senate and House of Representatives passed the Comprehensive Iran Sanctions, Accountability, and Divestment Act of 2010 (CISADA), signed into law by President Obama on July 1, 2010. The CISADA greatly enhanced restrictions on Iran, including the rescission of the authorization for Iranian-origin imports for articles such as rugs, pistachios, and caviar.

The sanctions imposed on Iran at the beginning of 2012 "had persistent and significant effects on the Iranian economy. The cost reached its maximum of 19.1% of real gross domestic product 4 years after the application of the sanctions, and the economy has not fully recovered after their removal."

On 31 July 2013, members of the United States House of Representatives voted 400 to 20 in favor of toughened sanctions.

The United States imposed additional financial sanctions against Iran, effective 1 July 2013.  An administration official explained that according to the new Executive Order "significant transactions in the rial will expose anyone to sanctions," and predicted “it should cause banks and exchanges to dump their rial holdings.” This took place as Iran's president-elect Hassan Rouhani was scheduled to take office on August 3, 2013.

Sanctions against third parties
In 2014, U.S. authorities put a $5 million bounty on Chinese businessman Li Fangwei, whom they alleged to have been instrumental in evading sanctions against Iran's missile programs.

In 2014, French bank BNP Paribas agreed to pay an $8.9 billion fine, the largest ever, for violating United States sanctions. Germany's Commerzbank, France's Credit Agricole and Swiss UBS have also been fined. French President François Hollande said: "When the (European) Commission goes after Google or digital giants which do not pay the taxes they should in Europe, America takes offence. And yet, they quite shamelessly demand 8 billion from BNP or 5 billion from Deutsche Bank."

In 2015, Germany's largest bank Deutsche Bank was fined $258 million for violating U.S. sanctions against Iran, Libya and Syria.

Iran nuclear deal
Under the Joint Comprehensive Plan of Action (known commonly as the Iran nuclear deal), signed in July 2015, the United States agreed to cancel most of the U.S. sanctions against Iran, with some safeguard provisions, in return for limitations on Iran's nuclear program.

Trump presidency 
In April 2018, the United States Department of Justice joined the United States Treasury Department's Office of Foreign Assets Control (OFAC), and the Department of Commerce to investigate possible violations of U.S. sanctions against Iran by China's Huawei. The U.S. inquiry stemmed from an earlier sanctions-violation probe that ultimately led to penalties against another Chinese technology company, ZTE Corporation. Huawei's deputy chair and CFO Meng Wanzhou, daughter of the company's founder Ren Zhengfei, was arrested in Vancouver, Canada on December 1, 2018, under an extradition request by United States authorities for allegedly putting HSBC bank at risk of violating U.S. sanctions on Iran.

In May 2019, the United States warned banks, investors, traders, and companies of the United Kingdom which trade with Iran through the Instrument in Support of Trade Exchanges (Instex) special purpose vehicle, that they will be punished somehow by Washington.

The Trump administration imposed sanctions on two UAE based aviation companies, Parthia Cargo and Delta Parts Supply, that violated U.S. sanctions on Iran's Mahan Air by providing them logistics services and supplying parts to the Iranian airline. Federal prosecutors also filed criminal charges against one of the companies under violation of United States export control regulations.

Countering America's Adversaries Through Sanctions Act

The Countering America's Adversaries Through Sanctions Act (CAATSA) was enacted in August 2017 and imposed sanctions against Iran, as well as against Russia and North Korea. CAATSA requires the President to impose sanctions against: (1) Iran's ballistic missile or weapons of mass destruction programs, (2) the sale or transfer to Iran of military equipment or the provision of related technical or financial assistance, and (3) Iran's Islamic Revolutionary Guard Corps and affiliated foreign persons. The President may also impose sanctions against persons responsible for violations of internationally recognized human rights committed against individuals in Iran, and can waive the imposition or continuation of sanctions.

Post-JCPOA sanctions
In May 2018, the United States President Donald Trump announced an intention to withdraw from the Joint Comprehensive Plan of Action (JCPOA or Iran nuclear deal), and subsequently imposed several new non-nuclear sanctions against Iran,  some of which were condemned by Iran as a violation of the deal.

These treasury and other arms of the government, both under Obama and Trump, have basically weakened the JCPOA extensively, which has kept a lot of the sanctions regime intact. In August 2018, the Trump administration reimposed sanctions and warned that anyone doing business with Iran will not be able to do business with the United States. However, the United States will be granting waivers to certain countries. For example, Iraq was granted a waiver that would allow the country to continue purchasing gas, energy and food products from Iran on the condition that the purchases were not paid for in United States dollars.

In 2018, the International Court of Justice (ICJ) "ordered" the United States government to revoke the sanctions on the basis of the 1955 United States-Iran "Friendship Treaty", that had been signed with the government that had been overthrown by the 1979 Islamic Revolution. In response, the United States withdrew from two international agreements with Iran.

In October 2018, Reuters reported that JPMorgan Chase bank had "agreed to pay $5.3 million to settle allegations it violated Cuban Assets Control Regulations, Iranian sanctions and Weapons of Mass Destruction sanctions 87 times, the United States Treasury said".

British bank Standard Chartered faced a $1.5 billion fine by the U.S. agencies for violating Iran sanctions.

In November 2018, the United States officially reinstated all sanctions against Iran that had been lifted before the United States withdrew from the JCPOA.

In April 2019, the United States threatened to sanction countries continuing to buy oil from Iran after an initial six-month waiver announced in November expired.

In June 2019, Trump imposed sanctions on Iranian Supreme Leader Khamenei, his office and those closely affiliated with his access to key financial resources.

On 31 July 2019, the United States placed sanctions on Iran's foreign minister, Mohammad Javad Zarif.

In August 2018, Total S.A. officially withdrew from the Iranian South Pars gas field because of sanctions pressure from the United States, leaving CNPC to take up their 50.1% stake in the natural gas field, of which it had already 30%. It held this 80.1% share until it withdrew its investment in October 2019 due once again to the U.S. sanctions, according to Oil Minister Bijan Zangeneh and the SHANA news agency.

On 19 May 2020, the United States sanctions targeted  Shanghai Saint Logistics Limited, a PRC-based company that provides general sales agent services for Mahan Air. The United States claimed that Iran used Mahan Air to carry gold of fuel sales of Venezuela. Also, Iran denied the allegation.

On 8 June 2020, the United States imposed new sanctions of Iran Shipping Lines (IRISL) and its Shanghai-based subsidiary, E-Sail Shipping Company Ltd (E-Sail).

The individuals and companies that had been added to United States sanctions list in 2018:

Iran reactions 
On 8 May 2019, according to article 36 of the JCPOA agreement, Iran was allowed to reply in case of non-compliance by other signatories. President Rouhani announced that Iran was acting in reply to "the European countries' failure" and held on to stockpiles of excess uranium and heavy water used in nuclear reactors. Rouhani said that Iran gave a 60-day deadline to remaining signatories of the JCPOA to protect it from U.S. sanctions and provide additional economic support. Otherwise, at the end of that deadline, Iran would exceed the limits on its stockpile of enriched uranium. In September 2019, as a third major step to scale down commitments to the 2015 nuclear accord, after another 60-day deadline, Iran nullified all limits on nuclear research and development.

Sanctions against IRGC
On 25 October 2007, the United States designated the Quds Force, a part of IRGC, a terrorist organization under Executive Order 13224, for providing material support to U.S.-designated terrorist organizations, prohibiting transactions between the group and U.S. citizens, and freezing any assets under United States jurisdiction.

On 18 May 2011, the United States imposed sanctions on Qasem Soleimani, the commander of the Quds Force, along with Syrian president Bashar al-Assad and other senior Syrian officials, due to Soleimani's alleged involvement in providing material support to the Syrian government. He was listed as a known terrorist, which forbade U.S. citizens from doing business with him.

On 8 April 2019, the United States imposed economic and travel sanctions on the IRGC and organizations, companies and individuals affiliated with it. Hossein Salami was one of the individuals listed.

On 15 April 2019, the United States designated the IRGC as a terrorist organization. The designation is still in force.

On 21 April 2019, a few days before United States sanctions were due to take effect, Iran Supreme Leader Ali Khamenei appointed Hossein Salami as the new commander-in-chief of the Islamic Revolutionary Guard Corps (IRGC).

On 7 June 2019, the United States imposed sanctions on some of the petroleum industry in Iran because they were owned by the IRGC.

On 24 June 2019, the US imposed sanctions on eight senior commanders of the navy, aerospace and ground forces components of IRGC.

In May 2020 the United States charged Iranian-Iraqi Amir Dianat and his Iranian business partner with money-laundering on behalf of the Quds Force and with violating sanctions.

Other sanctions
On 3 September 2019, Trump added the Iran Space Agency, the Iranian Astronautics Research Institute and the Iranian Space Research Center to its sanctions list.

On 20 September 2019, the United States imposed sanctions on the Central Bank of Iran (CBI), the National Development Fund of Iran (NDF) and Etemad Tejarate Pars Co., an Iranian company that was used to transfer money to the Ministry of Defence and Armed Forces Logistics.

In October 2019, the US imposed sanctions on some of the Iranian construction sector which is owned by Iran's Islamic Revolutionary Guard Corps (IRGC), which it regards as a foreign terrorist organization. The US State Department also identified four “strategic materials” being used in connection with military, nuclear, or ballistic missile programs, making trade in them subject to sanctions. However, the department extended nuclear-cooperation waivers on Iran's civil nuclear program, renewing them for 90 days.

On 4 November 2019, the United States imposed new sanctions on the core inner circle of advisers to the Ayatollah Ali Khamenei. The new sanctions included one of his sons, Mojtaba Khamenei, the newly appointed head of Iran's judiciary, Ebrahim Raisi, the supreme leader's chief of staff, Mohammad Mohammadi Golpayegani, and others. The Trump administration also issued $20 million to a reward for information about a former FBI agent who disappeared in Iran 12 years previously.

On 8 October 2020, the United States imposed further sanctions on Iran's financial sector, targeting 18 Iranian banks. The banks targeted are Amin Investment Bank, Bank Keshavarzi Iran, Bank Maskan, Bank Refah Kargaran, Bank-e Shahr, Eghtesad Novin Bank, Gharzolhasaneh Resalat Bank, Hekmat Iranian Bank, Iran Zamin Bank, Karafarin Bank, Khavarmianeh Bank, Mehr Iran Credit Union Bank, Pasargad Bank, Saman Bank, Sarmayeh Bank, Tosee Taavon Bank, Tourism Bank and Islamic Regional Cooperation Bank.

In September 2020, the United States said that it imposed sanctions on Judge Seyyed Mahmoud Sadati, Judge Mohammad Soltani, Branch 1 of the Revolutionary Court of Shiraz, and Adel Abad, Orumiyeh, and Vakilabad Prisons. Elliott Abrams said "the sanctions targeted a judge who sentenced Iranian wrestler Navid Afkari to death," who was convicted of murdering a security guard during the 2018 Iranian protests.

Biden presidency
United States President Joe Biden said on February 8, 2021, that he would not lift economic sanctions against Iran until Iran complies with the terms of the 2015 JCPOA nuclear deal. Iran's Supreme Leader Khamenei had previously said that Tehran would only return to compliance if the United States first lifted all economic sanctions. On the other hand, Iran said that it would suspend the implementation of the Additional Protocol, if the other parties to the 2015 nuclear pact do not fulfill their obligations by February 21, 2021.

On September 22, 2022, the United States Department of the Treasury announced sanctions against the Iran Morality Police as well as seven senior leaders of Iran's various security organizations, "for violence against protestors and the death of Mahsa Amini". These include Mohammad Rostami Cheshmeh Gachi, chief of Iran’s Morality Police, and Kioumars Heidari, commander of the Iranian army's ground force, in addition to the Iranian Minister of Intelligence Esmail Khatib, Haj Ahmad Mirzaei, head of the Tehran division of the Morality Police, Salar Abnoush, deputy commander of the Basij militia, and two law enforcement commanders, Manouchehr Amanollahi and Qasem Rezaei of the LEF in Chaharmahal and Bakhtiari province of Iran. The sanctions would involve blocking any properties or interests in property within the jurisdiction of the US, and reporting them to the US Treasury. Penalties would be imposed on any parties that facilitate transactions or services to the sanctioned entities.

Effects and criticism

According to an Iranian journalist, the effects of sanctions in Iran include expensive basic goods and an aging and increasingly unsafe aircraft fleet. "According to reports from Iranian news agencies, 17 planes have crashed over the past 25 years, killing approximately 1,500 people."

The United States forbids aircraft manufacturer Boeing to sell aircraft to Iranian aviation companies. However, there are some authorizations for the export of civil aviation parts to Iran when those items are required for the safety of commercial aircraft. An analysis by The Jerusalem Post found that a third of the 117 Iranian planes designated by the U.S. had experienced accidents or crashes.

A 2005 report, presented at the 36th session of the International Civil Aviation Organization, reported that the U.S. sanctions had endangered the safety of civil aviation in Iran because it prevented Iran from acquiring parts and support essential for aviation safety. It also stated that the sanctions were contrary to article 44 of the Chicago Convention (to which the U.S. is a member). The ICAO report said aviation safety affects human lives and human rights, stands above political differences, and that the assembly should bring international public pressure on the United States to lift the sanctions against Iran.

The European Union was critical of most of the U.S. trade sanctions against Iran. Some EU member states criticized ILSA as a "double standard" in U.S. foreign policy, in which the United States vigorously worked against the Arab League boycott of Israel while at the same time promoted a worldwide boycott of Iran. The EU member states threatened formal counter-action in the World Trade Organization.

According to a study by Akbar E. Torbat, "overall, the sanctions' economic effect" on Iran "has been significant, while its political effect has been minimal."

According to the United States National Foreign Trade Council, in the medium-term, lifting U.S. sanctions and liberalizing Iran's economic regime would increase Iran's total trade annually by as much as $61 billion (at the 2005 world oil price of $50/bbl), adding 32 percent to Iran's GDP. In the oil-and-gas sector, output and exports would expand by 25-to-50 percent (adding 3 percent to world crude oil production).

Iran could reduce the world price of crude petroleum by 10 percent, saving the United States annually between $38 billion (at the 2005 world oil price of $50/bbl) and $76 billion (at the proximate 2008 world oil price of $100/bbl). Opening Iran’s market place to foreign investment could also be a boon to competitive US multinational firms operating in a variety of manufacturing and service sectors.

In 2009, there was discussion in the United States of implementing "crippling sanctions" against Iran, such as the Iran Refined Petroleum Sanctions Act of 2009, "if diplomatic overture did not show signs of success by the autumn". Professor Hamid Dabashi, of Columbia University, said in August 2009 that this was likely to bring "catastrophic humanitarian consequences", while enriching and strengthening the "security and military apparatus" of "the Pasdaran and the Basij," and having absolutely no support from "any major or even minor opposition leader" in Iran. According to Bloomberg News, Boeing and Exxon have said that new Iran sanctions would cost $25 billion in U.S. exports.

It has also been argued the sanctions have had the counter effect of protecting Iran in some ways, for example the 2007 imposition of U.S. sanctions against Iranian financial institutions to a high degree made Iran immune to the then emerging global recession. Iranian officials argued that the sanctions created new business opportunities for Iranian companies to develop in order to fill the gap left by foreign contractors. According to U.S. officials, Iran may lose up to $60 billion in energy investments due to global sanctions.

On 18 January 2012 Russian Foreign Minister Sergey Lavrov warned that sanctions are aimed at strangling the economy of Iran and would create much discontent toward Western nations, and potentially provoke a negative recourse.

On 13 August 2018 Iran Supreme leader, Ayatollah Ali Khamenei, said that "mismanagement" harmed Iran more than U.S. sanctions did. "More than the sanctions, economic mismanagement (by the government) is putting pressure on ordinary Iranians ... I do not call it betrayal but a huge mistake in management," Khamenei was quoted as saying.

On 22 August 2018, United Nations Special Rapporteur Idriss Jazairy described the sanctions against Iran as "unjust and harmful". "The reimposition of sanctions against Iran after the unilateral withdrawal of the United States from the Iran nuclear deal, which had been unanimously adopted by the Security Council with the support of the United States itself, lays bare the illegitimacy of this action," said Jazairy. According to Jazairy, "chilling effect" caused by the "ambiguity" of recently reimposed sanctions, would lead to "silent deaths in hospitals".

According to Pakistan's Prime Minister Imran Khan, United States sanctions against Iran are affecting neighboring Pakistan. He stated that "The last thing the Muslim World needs is another conflict. The Trump administration is moving towards that direction."

On 5 May 2019, White House announced the United States has stationed an aircraft carrier strike group and Air Force bombers to the Middle East for “troubling and escalatory signs and warnings” connected to Iran. Mr. Bolton said the purpose of the action is sending a message to the Iranian regime that any attack on U.S. interests or on those of our allies by Iran will be faced with our unremitting response. Also, he declared in the statement, we are not looking for war with Iran but ready to repel to any attack, whether by proxy, the Islamic Revolutionary Guards Corps or regular Iranian forces.

On 19 May 2019, Trump threatened Iran and said in his Twitter post "If Iran wants to fight, that will be the official end of Iran. Never threaten the United States again!"

According to a 2019 AlJazeera report, some tech companies like as GitHub, Google and Apple and Microsoft began limiting users linked to Iran, and several other countries under U.S. sanctions, access to its services.

On 27 September 2019, Turkish President Recep Tayyip Erdoğan said that it is "impossible" for his country to stop buying oil and natural gas from Iran, despite U.S. sanctions against the latter. Iranian foreign minister Javad Zarif repeatedly condemned the American sanctions against Iran as "economic terrorism."

In June 2022, Iran claimed that despite changes imposed on by the continuance of U.S. sanctions, oil sales have remained at relatively high levels. According to figures from the petroleum ministry, Iran is currently exporting more than a million barrels of crude oil and gas condensate daily.

Impact on health

During the 2020 COVID-19 pandemic, health workers and sanctions experts said U.S. sanctions, including financial sanctions and lost oil revenues, were preventing the import of medicine and medical supplies including raw materials and equipment needed to manufacture medicines domestically.

The United States has ostensibly exempted humanitarian items from sanctions, but in practice the prohibition against business with Iranian banks and the reduction in issuance of certain medical export licenses by the United States Treasury Department enforcement agency have caused difficulties in Iran.  For example, Iran faces a critical shortage of spare parts that are needed to repair dual-use equipment used to produce medicine.  Sanctions have also prevented Iran from procuring active ingredients necessary to manufacture locally produced medicine to treat asthma, cancer, and multiple sclerosis.

In December 2020, according to the central bank chief of Iran, Iran could not pay for a COVID-19 vaccine because of U.S. sanctions against Iranian banks. In March 2020, during the first wave of the pandemic, the United States blocked Iran's request for an emergency $5 billion IMF loan.

After the United States withdrew from the 2015 Iran nuclear deal, many banks and businesses worldwide, including pharmaceutical and medical companies, decided not to conduct any business with Iran due to U.S. sanctions.

Impact on overseas students
As of December 2018, United States sanctions were reportedly affecting hundreds of Iranian university students in the United Kingdom, preventing them from being able to readily pay their tuition fees and forcing them to choose between abandoning their studies or using dangerous means to transfer funds.

Exceptions

In December 2010 it was reported that the United States Department of the Treasury's Office of Foreign Assets Control had approved nearly 10,000 exceptions to U.S. sanctions rules worldwide over the preceding decade by issuing special licenses for American companies.

European and United States sanctions do not affect Iran's electricity exports, which creates a loophole for Iran's natural gas reserves.

See also
 Sanctions against Iran
 Iran and Libya Sanctions Act of 1996
 Iran Freedom and Support Act of 2006
 Iran Sanctions Enhancement Act of 2007 (never passed)
 Comprehensive Iran Sanctions, Accountability, and Divestment Act of 2010
 National Defense Authorization Act for Fiscal Year 2012
 Countering America's Adversaries Through Sanctions Act
 Chicago's Persian heritage crisis
 Iran–United States relations
 Anti-Iranian sentiment
 Foreign direct investment in Iran
 Economy of Iran
 Instrument in Support of Trade Exchanges
 Iran and weapons of mass destruction
 Iran Mission Center

References

External links

 Iran Sanctions - Factbox (Summary and list of all sanctions on Iran since 1979)
 Iran Primer: U.S. Sanctions – PBS website
 Iran Sanctions: Strategy, Implementation, and Enforcement: Hearing before the Committee on Foreign Affairs, House of Representatives, One Hundred Twelfth Congress, Second Session, 17 May 2012

Iran–United States relations
Economy of Iran
Modern history of Iran
Politics of Iran
Sanctions against Iran
Iran